Nassarius silvardi is a species of sea snail, a marine gastropod mollusc in the family Nassariidae, the nassa mud snails or dog whelks.

Description
The length of the shell varies between 4 mm and 7.5 mm.

Distribution
This marine species occurs of Indonesia and Hawaii.

References

  Kool H.H. & Dekker H. (2006) Review of the Nassarius pauper (Gould, 1850) complex (Gastropoda: Nassariidae). Part 1, with the description of four new species from the Indo-West Pacific. Visaya 1(6): 54-75.
 Severns M. (2011) Shells of the Hawaiian Islands - The Sea Shells. Conchbooks, Hackenheim. 564 pp.

External links
 Galindo L.A., Kool H.H. & Dekker H. (2017). Review of the Nassarius pauperus (Gould, 1850) complex (Nassariidae): Part 3, reinstatement of the genus Reticunassa, with the description of six new species. European Journal of Taxonomy. 275: 1-43.
 Galindo, L. A.; Puillandre, N.; Utge, J.; Lozouet, P.; Bouchet, P. (2016). The phylogeny and systematics of the Nassariidae revisited (Gastropoda, Buccinoidea). Molecular Phylogenetics and Evolution. 99: 337-353
 

Nassariidae
Gastropods described in 2006